Somaliland is a self-declared republic in the Horn of Africa.

Somalia may also refer to:

Places
British Somaliland, a former British protectorate; present-day Somaliland
French Somaliland, a former French colony in the Horn of Africa; present-day Djibouti
Italian Somaliland, a former Italian colony; present-day Somalia
State of Somaliland, a short-lived independent country in the territory of present-day Somaliland

Ships
, a British frigate that served in the Royal Navy from 1944 to 1946